Imaginary Kingdom is the seventh studio album by New Zealand singer/songwriter Tim Finn. It was released on 6 October 2006 and peaked at number 18 on the New Zealand chart and 48 in Australia.

Track listing

Personnel
Tim Finn - vocals, acoustic guitar, piano, backing vocals, conga, foot drums, celeste, synth FX, pump organ, Indian flute, keys, rhodes, banana drum, prepared piano, vocal arrangement on 2 & 9
Bobby Huff - drums, backing vocals, percussion, programming, piano, organ, keys, electric guitar, backing vocals, vocal arrangement on 2 & 9
John Painter - bass, french horn, keys, electric guitar, lap steel guitar, percussion, trombone, trumpet, recorder, dilruba, acoustic guitar, portachord, stylophone
Dale Oliver - electric guitar, slide guitar, 12-string guitar, electric sitar
Robbie Huff - electric guitar
Victor Broden - bass on 1
Phil Madeira - organ
Nirva Dorsaint - backing vocals, guest vocalist on 9
Fleming McWilliams - guest vocalist on 2 & 12
Matt Walker - cello
Harper Finn - child's voice on 12
Tony Backhouse - vocal arrangement on 2, 9 & 11

Charts

References

Tim Finn albums
2006 albums
Capitol Records albums